Daphnella margaretae is a species of sea snail, a marine gastropod mollusk in the family Raphitomidae.

Description
The length of the shell varies between 8 mm and 14 mm.

Distribution
D. margaretae can be found in Atlantic and Caribbean waters, ranging from the eastern coast of Florida to Brazil.

References

 Lyons, William G. "New Turridae (Gastropoda: Toxoglossa) from south Florida and the eastern Gulf of Mexico." The Nautilus 86.1 (1972): 3–7.

External links
 Rosenberg, G.; Moretzsohn, F.; García, E. F. (2009). Gastropoda (Mollusca) of the Gulf of Mexico, Pp. 579–699 in: Felder, D.L. and D.K. Camp (eds.), Gulf of Mexico–Origins, Waters, and Biota. Texas A&M Press, College Station, Texas
 Gastropods.com: Daphnella margaretae
 

margaretae
Gastropods described in 1972